In case of a previous caesarean section a subsequent pregnancy can be planned beforehand to be delivered by either of the following two main methods:
 Vaginal birth after caesarean section (VBAC)
 Elective repeat caesarean section (ERCS)

Both have higher risks than a vaginal birth with no previous caesarean section. There are many issues which affect the decision for planned vaginal or planned abdominal delivery. There is a slightly higher risk for uterine rupture and perinatal death of the child with VBAC than ERCS, but the absolute increased risk of these complications is small, especially with only one previous low transverse caesarean section. 60–80% of women planning VBAC will achieve a successful vaginal delivery, although there are more risks to the mother and baby from an unplanned caesarean section than from an ERCS. Successful VBAC also reduces the risk of complications in future pregnancies more than ERCS.

Technique
Where the woman is labouring with a previous section scar (i.e. a planned VBAC in labour), depending on the provider, special precautions may be recommended. These include intravenous access (a cannula into the vein) and continuous fetal monitoring (cardiotocography or CTG monitoring of the fetal heart rate with transducers on the mother's abdomen). Most women in the UK should be counselled to avoid induction of labour if there are no medical reasons for it, as the risks of uterine rupture of the previous scar are increased if the labour is induced. Other intrapartum management options, including analgesia/anesthesia, are identical to those of any labour and vaginal delivery.

For ERCS, the choice of skin incision should be determined by what seems to be most beneficial for the present operation, regardless of the choice of the previous location as seen by its scar, although the vast majority of surgeons will incise through the previous scar to optimise the cosmetic result. Hypertrophic (very thick or unsightly) scars are best excised because it gives a better cosmetic result and is associated with improved wound healing. On the other hand, keloid scars should have their margins left without any incision because of risk of tissue reaction in the subsequent scar.

Selection criteria
The choice of VBAC or ERCS depends on many issues: medical and obstetric indications, maternal choice and availability of provider and birth setting (hospital, birthing center, or home). Some commonly employed criteria include:

Factors favoring VBAC
 If the previous caesarean(s) involved a low transverse incision there is less risk of uterine rupture than if there was a low vertical incision, classical incision, T-shaped, inverted T-shaped, or J-shaped incision.
 A previous successful vaginal delivery (before or after the caesarean section) increases the chances of a successful VBAC.
 The indication for the previous caesarean section should not be present in the current pregnancy.
 Location at an institution equipped to respond to emergencies with physicians immediately available to provide emergency care.

Factors favoring ERCS
 The more caesarean sections that a woman has had, the less likely she will be eligible for VBAC. VBAC after two or more prior lower uterine segment transverse CS is controversial. The Royal College of Obstetricians and Gynaecologists recommends that women with a prior history of even two previous uncomplicated low transverse Caesarean sections, in an otherwise uncomplicated pregnancy at term, with no contraindication for vaginal birth, may be considered suitable for planned VBAC.
 The presence of twins may reduce the chance of successful VBAC, but if the leading twin is head first (cephalic presentation) and there are no other reasons to recommend caesarean section, VBAC should be offered.
 VBAC may be discouraged if there are other medical complications but this will require an individualised assessment and discussion between the woman and her obstetrician.

According to ACOG guidelines, the following criteria may reduce the likelihood of VBAC success but should NOT preclude a trial of labour: having two prior caesarean sections, suspected fetal macrosomia at term (fetus greater than 4000-4500 grams in weight), gestation beyond 40 weeks, twin gestation, and previous low vertical or unknown previous incision type, provided a classical uterine incision is not suspected.

Criteria where ERCS should be performed
The presence of any of the following practically always mean that ERCS will be performed - but this decision should always be discussed with a senior obstetrician:
 Maternal request for elective repeat CS after counselling
 Maternal or fetal reasons to avoid vaginal birth in current pregnancy
 Previous uterine incision other than transverse segment including classical (longitudinal). The Royal College of Obstetricians and Gynaecologists recommends that women with a prior history of one classical (longitudinal) caesarean section should give birth by elective repeat caesarean section (ERCS).
 Unknown previous uterine incision
 Previous uterine rupture
 Previous hysterotomy or myomectomy where the uterine cavity was breached

VBAC versus no previous Caesarean section
VBAC, compared to vaginal birth without a history of Caesarean section, confers an increased risks for placenta previa, placenta accreta, prolonged labor, antepartum hemorrhage, uterine rupture, preterm birth, low birth weight, and stillbirth. However, some risks may be due to confounding factors related to the indication for the first caesarean, rather than due to the procedure itself.

Outcomes in VBAC versus ERCS
VBAC and ERCS differ in outcomes on many end-points.

The American Congress of Obstetricians and Gynecologists (ACOG) states that VBAC is associated with decreased maternal morbidity and a decreased risk of complications in future pregnancies than ERCS.

Uterine rupture
A caesarean section leaves a scar in the wall of the uterus which is considered weaker than the normal uterine wall. A VBAC carries a risk of uterine rupture of 22–74/10,000. There is virtually no risk of uterine rupture in women undergoing ERCS (i.e. a section before the onset of labour). If a uterine rupture does occur, the risk of perinatal death is approximately 6%. Mothers with a previous lower uterine segment cesarean are considered the best candidates for VBAC, as that region of the uterus is under less physical stress during labor and delivery.

Risks to the child
A VBAC carries a 2–3/10,000 additional risk of birth-related perinatal death when compared with ERCS. The absolute risk of such birth-related perinatal loss is comparable to the risk for women having their first birth. Planned VBAC carries an 8/10,000 risk of the child developing hypoxic ischaemic encephalopathy, but the long-term outcome of the infant with HIE is unknown and related to many factors.

On the other hand, attempting VBAC reduces the risk that the child will have respiratory problems after birth such as infant respiratory distress syndrome (IRDS), as rates are estimated at 2–3% with planned VBAC and 3–4% with ERCS.

Conversion from planned VBAC to Caesarean
Of the women who have previously had a Caesarean, only about 8% of them will opt for a VBAC. However, of the 8% that opt for a VBAC, between 75%-80% will successfully give birth vaginally, which is comparable to the overall vaginal delivery rate in the United States in 2010.

The chance of having a successful VBAC is decreased by the following factors:
 Labor induction
 No previous vaginal birth
 Body mass index greater than 30
 Previous caesarean for obstructed labour
 No epidural anaesthesia
 Previous preterm caesarean birth
 Cervical dilation at admission to labour ward less than 4 cm
 Less than 2 years from previous caesarean birth
 Advanced maternal age
 Support from hospital, care provider, and staff
When the first four factors are present, successful VBAC is achieved in only 40% of cases. In contrast, in women with a previous caesarean section who have had a subsequent vaginal birth, the chance of a successful vaginal birth again is estimated at 87–90%.

Risks in future pregnancies
ERCS, as compared to VBAC, further increases the risks of complications in future pregnancies. Complications whose risks significantly increase with increasing number of repeated caesarean sections include:
 Placenta accreta, estimated to be present in 0.2%, 0.3%, 0.6%, 2.1%, 2.3% and 6.7% of women undergoing their first, second, third, fourth, fifth, and sixth or more caesarean sections, respectively. According to the United States Agency for Healthcare Research and Quality, "Abnormal placentation has been associated with both maternal and neonatal morbidity including need for antepartum hospitalization, preterm delivery, emergent caesarean delivery, hysterectomy, blood transfusion, surgical injury, intensive care unit (ICU) stay, and fetal and maternal death and may be life-threatening for mother and baby."
 Hysterectomy, estimated to be performed in 0.7%, 0.4%, 0.9%, 2.4%, 3.5% and 9.0% of women undergoing their first, second, third, fourth, fifth, and sixth or more caesarean sections, respectively
 Injury to bladder, bowel or ureter
 Ileus
 The need for postoperative ventilation
 Intensive care unit admission
 Blood transfusion requirement, estimated at 7%, 8% and 14% with a history of two, three and five caesarean births, respectively.
 Duration of operative time and hospital stay.

Other
Aside from uterine rupture risk, the drawbacks of VBAC are usually minor and identical to those of any vaginal delivery, including the risk of perineal tearing. Maternal morbidity, NICU admissions, length of hospital stay, and medical costs are typically reduced following a VBAC rather than a repeat caesarean delivery.

A VBAC, compared with ERCS, carries around 1% additional risk of either blood transfusion (mainly because of antepartum hemorrhage), postpartum haemorrhage or endometritis.

Society and culture
While vaginal births after caesarean (VBAC) are not uncommon today, the rate of VBAC has declined to include less than 10% of births after previous caesarean in the USA. Although caesarean deliveries made up only 5% of births overall in the USA until the mid-1970s, it was commonly believed that for women with previous caesarean sections, "Once a Caesarean, always a Caesarean". A consumer-driven movement supporting VBAC changed medical practice and led to soaring rates of VBAC in the 1980s and early 1990s, but rates of VBAC dramatically dropped after the publication of a highly publicized scientific study showing worse outcomes for VBACs as compared to repeat caesarean and the resulting medicolegal changes within obstetrics. In 2010, the National Institutes of Health, U.S. Department of Health and Human Services, and American Congress of Obstetrics and Gynecology all released statements in support of increasing VBAC access and rates.

Trends in the United States
Although caesarean sections made up only 5% of all deliveries in the early 1970s, among women who did have primary caesarean sections, the century-old opinion held, "Once a caesarean, always a caesarean." Overall, cesarean sections became so commonplace that the caesarean delivery rate climbed to over 31% in 2006.  A mother-driven movement supporting VBAC changed standard medical practice, and rates of VBAC rose in the 1980s and early 1990s. However, a major turning point occurred in 1996 when one well publicized study in The New England Journal of Medicine reported that vaginal delivery after previous caesarean section resulted in more maternal complications than a repeat caesarean delivery. The American Congress of Obstetrics and Gynecology subsequently issued guidelines which identified VBAC as a high-risk delivery requiring the availability of an anesthesiologist, an obstetrician, and an operating room on standby. Logistical and legal (professional liability) concerns led many hospitals to enact overt or de facto VBAC bans. As a result, the rate at which VBAC was attempted fell from 26% in the early 1990s to 8.5% in 2006.

In March 2010, the National Institutes of Health met to consolidate and discuss the overall up-to-date body of VBAC scientific data and concluded, "Given the available evidence, trial of labor is a reasonable option for many pregnant women with one prior low transverse uterine incision.". Simultaneously, the U.S. Department of Health and Human Services Agency for Healthcare Research and Quality reported that VBAC is a reasonable and safe choice for the majority of women with prior caesarean and that there is emerging evidence of serious harms relating to multiple caesareans. In July 2010, The American Congress of Obstetricians and Gynecologists (ACOG) similarly revised their own guidelines to be less restrictive of VBAC, stating, "Attempting a vaginal birth after cesarean (VBAC) is a safe and appropriate choice for most women who have had a prior cesarean delivery, including for some women who have had two previous cesareans." and this is also the current position of the Royal College of Obstetricians and Gynaecologists in the UK.

Enhanced access to VBAC has been recommended based on the most recent scientific data on the safety of VBAC as compared to repeat caesarean section, including the following recommendation emerging from the NIH VBAC conference panel in March 2010, "We recommend that hospitals, maternity care providers, health care and professional liability insurers, consumers, and policymakers collaborate on the development of integrated services that could mitigate or even eliminate current barriers to trial of labor." The U.S Department of Health and Human Services' Healthy People 2020 initiative includes objectives to reduce the primary caesarean rate and to increase the VBAC rate by at least 10% each.

The American Congress of Obstetricians and Gynecologists (ACOG) modified the guidelines on vaginal birth after previous Caesarean delivery in 1999, 2004, and again in 2010. In 2004, this modification to the guideline included the addition of the following recommendation:
 In 2010, ACOG modified these guidelines again to express more encouragement of VBAC, but maintained it should still be undertaken at facilities capable of emergency care, though patient autonomy in assuming increased levels of risk should be respected (ACOG Practice Bulletin Number 115, August 2010).

The recommendation for access to emergency care during trial of labor has, in some cases, had a major impact on the availability of VBACs to birthing mothers in the US. For example, a study of the change in frequency of VBAC deliveries in California after the change in guidelines, published in 2006, found the VBAC rate fell to 13.5% after the change, compared with 24% VBAC rate before the change. The new recommendation has been interpreted by many hospitals as indicating a full surgical team must be standing by to perform a Caesarean section for the full duration of a VBAC woman's labor. Hospitals that prohibit VBACs entirely are said to have a 'VBAC ban'. In these situations, birthing mothers are forced to choose between having a repeat Caesarean section, finding an alternate hospital in which to deliver their babies or attempting delivery outside the hospital setting.

Most recently, enhanced access to VBAC has been recommended based on updated scientific data on the safety of VBAC as compared to repeat caesarean section, including the following recommendation emerging from the NIH VBAC conference panel in March 2010, "We recommend that hospitals, maternity care providers, health care and professional liability insurers, consumers, and policymakers collaborate on the development of integrated services that could mitigate or even eliminate current barriers to trial of labor." The U.S Department of Health and Human Services' Healthy People 2020 initiative includes objectives to reduce the primary cesarean rate and to increase the VBAC rate by at least 10% each.

Position statements 
ACOG recommends that obstetricians offer most women with one prior cesarean section with a low-transverse incision a trial of labor (TOLAC) and that obstetricians should discuss the risks and benefits of VBAC with these patients.

This VBAC success calculator is a useful educational tool (noted by the US Agency for Healthcare Research and Quality) for clinicians who are discussing the risks and benefits of VBAC with their patients.

See also 
 Caesarean section

References

External links
 www.caesarean.org.uk: Independent UK website providing information and support on caesarean and VBAC issues.
  this is a good summary of the current knowledge and opinion on this subject.
 NIH Vaginal Birth After Cesarean (VBAC) Conference - Panel Statement: Statement from panel of medical experts regarding VBAC safety.
 Clinical Guidelines and Recommendations: Detailed summary of scientific research regarding the safety of VBAC and repeated Caesarean section is included in an evidence report pdf at the bottom of the page.
 ACOG - Ob Gyns Issue Less Restrictive VBAC Guidelines: Updated ACOG guidelines regarding VBAC.
 National Guideline Clearinghouse | Print: Vaginal Birth After Cesarean (VBAC) : Comparison of the current ACOG (USA) and RCOG (UK) guidelines related to VBAC management.

Childbirth
Midwifery
Obstetrical procedures
Caesarean sections